Cirkus Agora is one of five travelling circuses in Norway.  It was started in 1989 by Jan Kjetil Smørdal, it went bankrupt after a trip to iceland in 2008 and then again the following year.

References

External links
Official Website

Circuses
Circus